The Bangladesh National Awami Party, or National Awami Party (Muzaffar), is a left wing political party in Bangladesh.

History
National Awami Party (Muzaffar) traces its origin to a split of the National Awami Party into two factions, one pro-China and one pro-Moscow. The pro-Moscow fraction was National Awami Party (Wali), led by Khan Abdul Wali Khan, and the pro-China was called National Awami Party (Bhashani), led by Abdul Hamid Khan Bhashani. Muzaffar Ahmed was a leader of the National Awami Party (Wali) in East Pakistan. After the Independence of Bangladesh in 1971, the East Pakistan branch of National Awami Party (Wali) became an independent party; the National Awami Party (Muzaffar).

The party participated in the Bangladesh Liberation War, through the NAP-CPB-Chhatra Union Guerrilla Bahini. Muzaffar was an organizer of the guerrilla force.

Electoral registry
The party is registered with the Bangladesh Election Commission as "Bangladesh National Awami Party", and its election symbol is a house. The central party office is located in Dhanmondi Hawkers Market, Dhaka.

References

 
1971 establishments in Bangladesh
Political parties established in 1971
Political parties in Bangladesh
Socialist parties in Bangladesh